Syed Sibt-e-Hasan (Urdu: سید سبط حسن) (31 July 1916 – 20 April 1986) was an eminent scholar, journalist and political activist of Pakistan. He is regarded as one of the pioneers  of Socialism and Marxism in Pakistan, as well as the moving spirit behind the Progressive Writers Association.

Life 
Sibte Hassan was born on 31 July 1916 in kushaha, 
Ambari, Azamgarh, Uttar Pradesh, India. During his college days he had Amarnath Jha and Firaq Gorakhpuri as teachers, both who would end up as some of India's greatest intellectuals and recipients of the Padma Bhushan, the third-highest civilian award in the country. He graduated from Aligarh Muslim University. For higher studies, he went to Columbia University, US. In 1942, Sibte Hasan joined the Communist Party of India. After partition of India, he migrated to Lahore, Pakistan in 1948. He also served as editor of noted journals including; Naya Adab and Lail-o-Nehar. He died of a heart attack on 20 April 1986 in New Delhi while returning from a conference in India. He was buried in Karachi. His most remarkable work is Musa Se Marx Tak.

Work 

 Musa se Marx tak
For many decades, Musa se Marx Tak was the fundamental guiding texts for the activists and students of the leftist politics of Pakistan.

 Shehr-e-Nigaraan
 Mazi ke Mazar
  Pakistan main Tehzeeb ka Irtaqa 
In Pakistan Main Tehzeeb ka Irtiqa, Hassan wrote on the history of Pakistani people and the country's material and economic basis. It was unlike the history that eulogises rulers and kings.
 Inqilaab-e-Iran
 Naveed-e-Fikr
 Afkaar-e-Taza (This is a book consisting of critical essays on various personalities and answers to critics on various ideas)
 Adab aur Roshan Khayali
 Sukhan dar Sukhan
 The Battle of Ideas in Pakistan
 Bhagat Singh Our Us Ky Sathi
 Marx Aur Mashriq (He analysed the analysis of Marx and Engels on the eastern traditions and formation of society)

References

Pakistani communists
Muhajir people
Pakistani scholars
Aligarh Muslim University alumni
People from Azamgarh
Pakistani Marxists
Pakistani socialists
1986 deaths
1916 births
Columbia University alumni
Journalists from Karachi
Writers from Karachi
Pakistani Shia Muslims
Muslim socialists
Communist Party of India politicians from Uttar Pradesh